C. J. Harris may refer to:

 C.J. Harris (singer), American music artist and sixth-place finalist on American Idols thirteenth season
 C. J. Harris (basketball), American basketball player
 Johnson Harris, native American politician